Lietuvos skautų sąjunga (LSS, Scout Association of Lithuania) is one of Lithuania's Scouting organizations. The organization serves about 1,300 members as of 2008.

History

LSS claims to be the oldest Scouting organization in Lithuania. Its predecessor was established in 1930, although there are some opinions that it happened much earlier, in 1918, but that was only the embryo phase.

In 1918,  established the first Scout troop in Lithuania. In 1922, the first general assembly united the Lithuanian Scout Movement into the first Scout Association of Lithuania (SAL). This date could be argued as the year of establishment of Scout Association of Lithuania, for in 1930 when the law of Lithuanian Scouting Association (LSA) became effective all other organizations were united under the new name.

After Soviet Union occupied Lithuania, the Scout Association of Lithuania was suspended, but rehabilitated in 1988 in Vilnius.

Ideals

Lithuania Scout Association is unpolitical, non-profit making freewill driven youth organization. The aim of Lithuania Scout Association is to educate our members to be honest, high-minded, conscious citizens with the guidance of Robert Baden-Powell’s methods.

Scout law

 A Scout is straight forward and keeps their word.
 A Scout is faithful to God and Motherland.
 A Scout is useful and helps neighbors.
 A Scout is a friend to neighbors and is a brother or sister to other Scouts.
 A Scout is polite.
 A Scout is a friend of nature.
 A Scout obeys parents and the authorities.
 A Scout is lively, does not lose both self-control and hope.
 A Scout is thrifty.
 A Scout is sober and chaste in mind, words and actions.

Scout motto

The Scout Motto is Budek, translating as Be Prepared in Lithuanian. The Lithuanian noun for a single Scout is Skautas.

External links

  

Non-aligned Scouting organizations
Scouting and Guiding in Lithuania
Organizations based in Vilnius